The New Zealand Heading Dog is a working and herding dog that uses its visual prowess, intelligence and quick movement to control sheep. Bred from Border Collies, Heading Dogs are a sturdy, long-legged and even-haired breed. They are generally black and white in color, but may also be tan.

History 
The New Zealand Heading Dog is descended from the Border Collie, a breed of dog originally from the Scottish border. Early settlers brought these dogs to New Zealand to herd sheep, then went on to breed more specified dogs. Due to the Border Collie's long hair, they were bred with shorter haired dogs to create a breed that was better suited to the hot summers of the local environment. They were also bred to have less of an instinct to lie down than a border collie, standing still on their feet to make them more visible to the shepherd at long distance in the native tussock, and to run longer distances, and in some lines to be larger and more "hard nosed" to deal more easily with cattle.

The New Zealand Heading Dog has since been an integral part of sheepdog trials, which began in New Zealand as early as 1867 in Wanaka. The competitive dog sport involves herding sheep around a field and into enclosures.

The Heading Dog is the fourth most common breed of dog in New Zealand.

Description 
New Zealand Heading Dogs are very aware of their surroundings and are able to adapt to quick movements that are in their line of sight, suiting their shepherding requirements, and are able to run long distances day after day. These types of dogs are specifically bred and trained to work in farms to circle sheep and cattle. They work with a strong eye, barking and nipping is discouraged in trials, but some will when more pressure is needed. They are medium to large dogs with smooth, straight hair. New Zealand Heading Dogs are often black and white, but some may be tan or other colors. The breed requires an agrarian environment and are generally not intended to be kept as house pets. New Zealand Heading Dogs are extremely intelligent, active dogs with instinct to herd animals; if left alone for too long, they may try to escape and/or herd small animals or children.

See also
 Dogs portal
 List of dog breeds

References

Dog breeds originating in New Zealand
Herding dogs